Dirty blues is a form of blues music that deals with socially taboo and obscene subjects, often referring to sexual acts and drug use. Because of the sometimes graphic subject matter, such music was often banned from radio and available only on jukeboxes. The style was most popular in the years before World War II, although it experienced a revival in the early 1950s.

Many songs used innuendo, slang terms, or double entendres, such as Lil Johnson's "Press My Button (Ring My Bell)" ("Come on baby, let's have some fun / Just put your hot dog in my bun"). However, some were very explicit. The most extreme examples were rarely recorded at all, a notable exception being Lucille Bogan's obscene version of "Shave 'Em Dry" (1935), which Elijah Wald has noted as "by far the most explicit blues song preserved at a commercial pre-war recording session".

The more noteworthy musicians who utilised the style included Bo Carter, Bull Moose Jackson, Harlem Hamfats, Wynonie Harris, and Hank Ballard and The Midnighters.

Compilation albums include The Copulatin' Blues (Stash Records: 1976, re-released Mojo Records: 1996), Them Dirty Blues (Jass Records: 1989) and You Got to Give Me Some of It: 55 Risque Blues and R&B Classics 1928–1954 (Jasmine Records: 2015).

Notable songs

NB. According to AllMusic, this list of dirty blues songs also included "What the Blues Is All About" by Chick Willis, "Cigarette" by Backwards Sam Firk, and "Georgia Grind" (1926).  The latter's music was written by Spencer Williams and recorded by Blue Lu Barker and Louis Armstrong among others.

See also
Dirty rap
Hokum

References

Blues music genres

Off-color humor
Obscenity controversies in music